Merseybeat is a British television police procedural drama series, created and principally written by Chris Murray, first broadcast on BBC One on 16 July 2001. The series follows the personal and professional lives of one shift of police officers from the fictional Newton Park police station in Merseyside, England. A total of four series were broadcast, with the final episode airing on 19 January 2004. The series had an ensemble cast, initially led by Haydn Gwynne as Superintendent Susan Blake. However, only three actors remained with the programme through all four series: John McArdle, Chris Walker and David Hargreaves. In 2001, prior to the programme's official launch, the first episode attracted controversy due to alleged similarities between its plot and the murder of James Bulger. However, BBC bosses defended the series, stating "there are no associations with the tragic case of James Bulger".

In July and August 2002, Merseybeat faced strong criticism upon its return for a second series. The broadcasting standards commission criticised the quality of the series, and ratings fell sharply. In June 2002, ratings fell below five million viewers for the first time in the programme's history and, in August of the same year, The Guardian reported that the number of viewers had dropped by one million compared to the opening episode of the second series. In late 2003, when Merseybeat commenced its fourth series, it underwent a major revamp, including the scrapping of the title sequence and theme tune. A new closing theme was introduced, while each individual episode opened with a different musical number, including tracks from the likes of The Mock Turtles, Travis and Cast. A more "gritty" approach to the series was also taken as part of the revamp, with the introduction of the station's Criminal Investigation Department, led by Mark Womack, formerly of Liverpool 1 as DI Pete Hammond.

For the first three series, filming took place mainly in the Cheshire towns of Widnes and Runcorn (both within the Borough of Halton), including other locations within Merseyside - making frequent use of local landmarks such as the Silver Jubilee Bridge and Fiddlers Ferry power station. The police station itself was a disused Golden Wonder factory, which is located in Widnes. For the fourth and final series, filming moved wholly to Liverpool; with some locations used in St. Helens, Merseyside. The programme is notable for having never been repeated since broadcast; and despite strong interest from fans, it has never been released on DVD.
During filming, the original title of the show was Silver Command.

Cast
 Haydn Gwynne as Supt. Susan Blake (Series 1–3)
 John McArdle as Insp./Supt. Jim Oulton
 Jonathan Kerrigan as PC Steve Traynor (Series 1–3)
 Chris Walker as PC Larry "Tiger" Barton
 David Hargreaves as Sgt. Bill Gentle
 Michelle Holmes as PC/Sgt. Connie Harper (Series 1–3)
 Josie D'Arby as PC Jodie Finn (Series 2–4)
 Joanna Taylor as PC Jackie Brown (Series 2–4)
 Leslie Ash as Insp. Charlie Eden (Series 3–4)
 Scot Williams as PC Glenn Freeman (Series 4)
 Mark Womack as DI Pete Hammond (Series 4)
 Shelley Conn as PC Miriam Da Silva (Series 1)
 Danny Lawrence as Sgt. Danny Jackson (Series 1)
 Bernard Merrick as Sgt. Mark "Pepper" Salt (Series 2–3)
 Gary Cargill as Sgt. Lester Cartwright (Series 4)
 Kaye Wragg as PC Dee Milton (Series 1)
 Kevin Harvey as DC Vince Peterson (Series 4)
 Claire Sweeney as DS Roz Kelly (Series 4)
 Eileen O'Brien as SRO Maddie Wright (Series 1–3)
 Tupele Dorgu as SRO Natalie Vance (Series 4)
 Stephen Moore as Ch. Con. Mike Bishop (Series 1–2)
 Sean Arnold as Ch. Con. William Harvey (Series 3)
Joshua Littler as Charlie Blake (Series 1)
 Paul Brown as Dr. Al Blake (Series 1-3)

Series overview

Episode list

Series 1 (2001)

Series 2 (2002)
The second series introduced three new main characters into the cast - probationary PCs Jodie Finn (Josie D'Arby) and Jackie Brown (Joanna Taylor), as well as new custody Sergeant Mark 'Pepper' Salt (Bernard Merrick). This series saw the programme take a step away from crime-fighting and focuses more on the personal relationships between the main characters, much like the show's main rival at the time, The Bill. Episode two was broadcast an hour later than usual due to the content of the episode; this however resulted in an increase of viewership, with more than 1.5m additional viewers tuning in compared to the previous week.

Series 3 (2002–03)

Series 4 (2003–04)

References

External links

BBC television dramas
2001 British television series debuts
2004 British television series endings
2000s British drama television series
British drama television series
English-language television shows
Television shows set in Liverpool
2000s British crime television series